The following highways are numbered 513:

Canada
Alberta Highway 513
Manitoba Provincial Road 513
Newfoundland and Labrador Route 513
 Ontario Highway 513 (former)

India
 National Highway 513 (India)

United States
  Florida State Road 513
  Indiana State Road 513
  Maryland Route 513
  Nevada State Route 513 (former)
  County Route 513 (New Jersey)
  New Mexico State Road 513
  Ohio State Route 513
  Pennsylvania Route 513
  Puerto Rico Highway 513
  Washington State Route 513